Llanfyllin railway station is the former terminal station of the Llanfyllin Branch of Cambrian Railways, which served the town of Llanfyllin in Powys, Wales.

The whole line opened from Llanymynech via Llansantffraid, Llanfechain and Bryngwyn in 1863, to enable access to the limestone quarries along the Llanfyllin valley. After leaving  station, the LB crossed the Ellesmere Canal and travelled due west to Llanfyllin.

The goods shed and station survive, albeit as part of the industrial estate which now occupies the old station site. The street leading to it is still called Station Road.

References

Former Cambrian Railway stations
Railway stations in Great Britain opened in 1863
Railway stations in Great Britain closed in 1965
Beeching closures in Wales
Disused railway stations in Powys
Llanfyllin